Jaak-Heinrich Jagor (born 11 May 1990) is an Estonian hurdler. He competed in the 400 metres hurdles event at the 2015 World Championships in Beijing without qualifying for the final. His personal best in the 400 metres hurdles is 49.37 seconds set in Tallinn in 2015.

Competition record

References

External links
 

1990 births
Living people
Estonian male hurdlers
World Athletics Championships athletes for Estonia
Place of birth missing (living people)
Athletes (track and field) at the 2016 Summer Olympics
Olympic athletes of Estonia
Sportspeople from Pärnu
European Games competitors for Estonia
Athletes (track and field) at the 2019 European Games
Competitors at the 2017 Summer Universiade